No Name or Noname may refer to:

Geography
No Name, Colorado
No Name Key, an island in the Florida Keys
No Name Tunnel, located near the town in Colorado

Art, entertainment, and media

Fictional entities
No-Name (character), a fictional character in the Marvel Comics Universe
No Name (Nanashi), the protagonist of the anime film Sword of the Stranger

Literature
No Name (novel), an 1862 novel by Wilkie Collins
Noname, a pen-name of Luis Senarens

Music

Artists
Noname (rapper), American rapper, poet, and record producer 
No Name (Montenegrin band)
No Name (Slovak band)
NO NAME, a subgroup of nine members from the Japanese girl group AKB48, formed to provide the singing and voices for the Japanese TV Series AKB0048
(K)NoW_NAME, a Japanese musical unit

Albums
No Name, a studio album by Irish singer Ryan O'Shaughnessy
No Name (EP) a 2022 EP

Songs
"No Name" (Ryan O'Shaughnessy song), 2012
"No Name" (NF song), 2018
"No Name Nos. 1-4", four songs by Elliott Smith from Roman Candle
"No Name No. 5", a song by Elliott Smith from Either/Or

Enterprises
No Name (brand), a private-label brand of Loblaw Companies Limited grocery stores in Canada

Other uses
Cocaine (drink), also marketed as "No Name", an energy drink

See also
Anonymous (disambiguation)
Nameless (disambiguation)
No Logo
Nomen nescio, used to signify an anonymous or non-specific person
Sin Nombre virus
Untitled (disambiguation)